Thomas Joseph Cuite (March 4, 1913 – August 9, 1987) was an American politician from New York.

Biography
He was born on March 4, 1913, in Brooklyn, New York City, the son of Thomas F. Cuite. He attended the parochial schools, and graduated from St. Francis College in 1935.  Then he joined his father's real estate business. During World War II he served in the U.S. Army Coast Artillery Corps, attaining the rank of lieutenant colonel. He married Kathlyn Killeen, and they had two children.

Cuite was a member of the New York State Senate from 1953 to 1958, sitting in the 169th, 170th and 171st New York State Legislatures.

In November 1958, he ran for Congress in the 12th district but was defeated by the incumbent Republican Francis E. Dorn.

Cuite was a member of the New York City Council from 1960 to 1985, and was Majority Leader from 1969 to 1985. Closely tied to the Catholic Church—he was an adviser to John Cardinal O'Connor, Terence Cardinal Cooke and Francis Cardinal Spellman—he worked as majority leader with the Catholic archdiocese for a dozen years to block a vote on a proposed city law to guarantee gay rights.

Cuite died on August 9, 1987, in Lutheran Medical Center in Brooklyn, of a heart attack.

Sources

1913 births
1987 deaths
Politicians from Brooklyn
Democratic Party New York (state) state senators
New York City Council members
United States Army officers
20th-century American politicians
Military personnel from New York City
United States Army personnel of World War II
United States Army Coast Artillery Corps personnel
St. Francis College alumni